The Last of the Immortals is a military science fiction novel written by the Russian science fiction writer Andrey Livadny as part of his The History of the Galaxy series. The novel is also sometimes published under the name Retaliatory Strike.

Plot 

The story begins in the year 3870, with Galact-Captain Ivan Tamantsev of the Confederacy of Suns defending an unarmed convoy from a group of pirate ships. Despite managing to destroy four of the attacking ships, Tamantsev loses his wingman and is himself forced to eject, after his fighter sustains heavy damage. His escape pod is towed by the pirates to their homeworld of Ganio, settled by colonists of Middle Eastern descent. Tamantsev is brought before Faizullah of the Javgeth Clan, the man who ordered the raid on the convoy. He explains to the Captain his options: he can either agree to temporary employment by the Clans as a pilot, until he pays off the destruction of the four fighters and their AI modules (the fighters were unmanned), or Faizullah can let him go with the knowledge that Tamantsev will not survive long on the desert world. While Ivan agrees to fly missions for Faizullah (fully aware that the Ganian intends to go back on his word), he demands to personally inspect his fighter. Upon arriving to the hangar, he sees that it is an ancient Phantom-class aerospace fighter from the days of the First Galactic War with the Earth Alliance. While he shudders at the thought of flying this 1500-year-old antique, Ivan knows that this is his best shot of escaping the planet. Faizullah's engineers agree to let him inside the fighter, as they have disabled all of the craft's AI functions. However, they underestimate the Confederate pilot training, and Tamantsev is able to restart the systems in service mode and launch the ship manually.

Upon entering orbit, Ivan faces another problem, as the Phantom does not have enough fuel to jump to another system, and the old fighter is no match for the Ganio's orbital defenses. Ivan scans the local hypersphere force lines and determines that one of them is unmarked on all star charts (i.e. it does not lead anywhere). Realizing he has nothing to lose, Tamantsev transitions into hypersphere and uses the last of his fuel to maneuver the ship to intersect with the unmarked force line, remembering that 3 million years ago, none of the known races did not possess hyperdrives (it is an invention unique to humans). Instead, they used stationary portals which used the hypersphere force lines as conduits to rapidly send objects between planets. Ivan's theory turns out to be correct, and his fighter enters one such conduit and rapidly travels to another system far from Ganio. Unfortunately, the conduit throws his ship out into normal space into a planet's low orbit. Lacking fuel, Ivan is unable to slow down his descent and is forced to eject, while the Phantom crashes in the nearby woods. Before ejecting, Ivan notices a city protected by a giant wall not too far from the crash site.

After getting out of his escape pod, Tamantsev decides to head towards the city, assuming it to be yet another lost colony, settled during the Great Exodus of the 23rd century. Following standard protocols, Ivan does not remove his spacesuit until he can determine that the air is safe to breathe and there are no harmful microorganisms in the planet's biosphere. However, after several days of walking, he runs out of air and is forced to crack the seal. Ivan finds that the air is safe to breathe but shortly succumbs to a strange ailment, which persists for several hours before going away just as suddenly as it appeared. He finds that he is able to sense living creatures without actually hearing or seeing them. His newfound empathic ability allows him to see any living thing's neural structure, which he uses to kill a local predator with a single shot to the brain (the largest neural mass). Some time later, he witnesses an ambush of a woman by a dozen shapeshifting creatures. He rescues her by using his empathic ability to determine the location of the creatures' brains before shooting them. After recovering, the woman reveals that her name is Flora Shodan, and that she is descended from the settlers who arrived aboard the colony ship Hope (they are aware that their ancestors came from Earth).

After Ivan notices that Flora is able to literally turn invisible, she reveals that all of the arrivals underwent genetic mutation to varying degrees upon first breathing the planet's air. The mutations have created four distinct subspecies: Shadows, Metamorphs, Emglans, and Chosen. Flora was born a Shadow and is able to turn her body (not her clothes) invisible, has empathic abilities, and is able to heal by touch. Metamorphs are shapeshifters, capable of assuming any shape, including flawlessly imitating another person. Emglans are telepaths and are able to sense a person's general state of mind from miles away. The Chosen have remained mostly human. All of Doom's (name given to the planet by the colonists) inhabitants have one ability in common: they are immortal. The body of any person over 30 stops aging, so some of those who arrived aboard the Hope are still alive. However, the mutations also affects the birth rate. As such, no child has been born in over 200 years (Flora herself is only 302 and is viewed as a girl by many others). Many of the colonists have gone insane as the result of the changes and have fled to the wilderness. The survivors came across a giant wall built millions of years ago and built their City behind it. The human society consists of five castes called satts (named after the captain of the Hope, Satt Valtorn). The Shadow, Metamorph, Emglan, and Chosen Satts are all exclusively made up of their respective subspecies, while the Warrior Satt is made up of former members of the other satts who have chosen the life of danger and wish to protect the City from the wild metamorphs using antiquated equipment, salvaged from the Hope.

After relaying all this information, Flora reveals that Ivan himself has become a Shadow. Ivan asks Flora why she was outside the City, and she replies that she was looking for a pair of invisible assailants, who have attacked a Chosen and stolen his car. The description of the attack leads Ivan to believe that he is not the only outsider on this world. He repairs her damaged vehicle, and they head back to the City, where Ivan is greeted with caution. Flora invites Ivan to be a guest at her house until he is given a place of his own (due to machines doing all menial work in the City, everybody's basic needs are satisfied (food, shelter, clothing, etc.), realizing that she was falling for the young stranger from the stars. The next day, Ivan and Flora head to the monthly Satt Council meeting, where Ivan hopes to convince the satts of the danger of the outside galaxy. However, Ivan's inexperience with his mental abilities causes a panic, and he is forced to wait outside. He overhears an argument between Flora and Derek Kelgan, the head of the Chosen Satt, who refuses to listen to her and the "infant" she brought with her and even threatens to kill her if she starts disturbing the peace. Fed up, Ivan assaults Kelgan and forces him to apologize to Flora. Upon returning to Flora's house, they realize that they have fallen in love and spend the night together. The next morning, Ivan decides to leave the City and join the Warrior Satt to both attempt to protect the colony and keep Flora safe from Kelgan's attempts at revenge. Flora refuses to listen to his reasons, only concerned with him leaving her.

Upon arriving to the Boundary (the name given to the ancient wall protecting the city), Ivan is accepted into the Warrior Satt. Meanwhile, Flora calms down and realizes that Ivan was only trying to protect her. She remembers that he was trying to find out more about the colony's past and asks her friend Nicolai Lorgen, a Chosen, to retrieve the information from his satt's archives. In the attempt to please Flora, with whom he has long been enamored, Nick copies the data onto a service droid and sends it to Flora's house. However, he is caught by his father Richard Lorgen, who decides to punish his son and tells Kelgan about it. Kelgan sends droids to assassinate Flora and Ivan. Due to some quick thinking, Flora survives the attempt and uses the maintenance shafts running under the City to get to the Boundary, along with her friends Ryben (a Metamorph) and Nive (an Emglan) and the service droid. Ivan is out on nightly patrol of the Boundary when an assassin droid tries to kill him with a sniper rifle. Unlike the locals, Tamantsev trusts technology more than his senses, and that is what saves him. After destroying the droid, he reunited with Flora and asks Lymel, the head of the Warrior Satt to give him a vehicle for traveling outside the city. After examining the wreckage of the Phantom, Ivan confirms his suspicions that his entire escape from Ganio was orchestrated by someone who wants access to Doom. He reads through the data from the service droid and discovers that Satt Valtorn disappeared after departing on an expedition to a set of alien buildings not too far from the colony. They head to a complex of ancient structures on a plateau, nicknamed the Claw by the colonists. On the way there, Ivan experiences a set of visions, which are actually data implanted in his brain during his service in the Confederate special forces and activated by certain visual cues. He puts the pieces together and realizes that Doom is a site of an ancient bio-lab set up by the Harammins 3 million years ago to develop bio-weapons in their fight against the Insects. The planet Paradise, visited by humans earlier, was a test site for one of their experiments to create shapeshifters (see novel Paradise Lost). The research was abandoned following the isolation of the O'Hara cluster, although it did yield an unexpected side effect — the Harramin Holy Grail, immortality. Now, someone wants to learn the secret of immortality at any cost.

Earlier, on Ganio, Gour, the last surviving member of the Harammin Immortal Quota, is watching his plan unfold. He had paid Faizullah to capture a Confederate pilot and orchestrated his entire escape, including the jump using a hypersphere conduit. The jump also activated an ancient Harammin portal on Ganio, long buried under the desert sand. Gour tricks Faizullah into digging out the portal and sending a strike force to eliminate the human inhabitants of Doom before sending out his own forces to kill the survivors, including the Ganians. Meanwhile, Ivan is setting up the defenses along the Boundary, expecting an attack, when Faizullah arrives with his troops and three Hoplite-class serv-machines, capable of reducing the giant wall and the City to rubble in a matter of minutes. Tamantsev contacts Faizullah and makes him realize that he has been betrayed. Faizullah, being a man of honor, agrees to join forces with the defenders and fight off Gour's forces. Ivan takes one of the Hoplites, while Faizullah takes another. They use the drain the batteries of the third one to send a message through hypersphere, calling in the Confederate fleet, knowing full well that the fleet will never get to Doom in time. Ivan asks Flora to go to the City and convince Kelgan to shut down the City's power grid, as the machines sent by Gour will interpret the City's power signatures as hostile targets and open fire on civilians. Flora calls Kelgan and explains the situation, but he refuses to listen, believing Flora and the Warrior Satt to be traitors for letting outsiders into the City. He orders Richard Lorgen to send a squad of droids to strike at the defenders from behind. Nive reveals to Flora that he used to be the Hope'''s chief engineer and knows the City's power grid inside-out. He goes to shut the grid down manually, while Flora and Ryben return to the Boundary to help the defenders. Unfortunately, Nive is too late, and the three attacking Phalanxer-class serv-machines launch high-yield missiles at key power signatures in the City, killing many civilians, including Kelgan himself. The defenders fight serv-machines and assault droids and, never having to face such enemies before, take heavy losses. The Ganians, true to their word, fight and die with them side by side. Despite the odds, Ivan and Faizullah manage to take out most of the enemy serv-machines, although they are heavily wounded and their Hoplites'' destroyed. Conquering their overwhelming fear of death, the defenders charge the assault droids, dying by the dozens but also taking out a large chunk of the enemy forces. Despite the arrival of Kelgan's droids, the defenders manage to win the day. Flora and Ivan are reunited. The wounded Faizullah understands that he has now become a mutant himself, along with two dozen of his men. Knowing that they can never go home (they would risk spreading the mutating agents to the galaxy), Faizullah decides to stay and declares the creation of the Ganio Satt. Gour, who arrives through the portal several hours later is captured by Ryben, who prevents the Harammin from cracking the seal of his helmet and breathing in Doom's air.

External links
 Official site of the series

2008 novels
Military science fiction novels
Russian science fiction novels
2008 science fiction novels
Eksmo books